Agura (also called anza ) is the Japanese term for the position normally referred to as sitting cross-legged in English.

Description
The buttocks are on the floor (or on a cushion set on the floor) and the legs are out in front, with the knees bent and each foot crossed beneath the other leg.

Cultural background
In Japan, this posture is considered an informal alternative to the seiza (proper sitting) position, though it is generally considered unfeminine and uncouth for women if sitting in skirts or certain types of traditional clothing, such as the kimono (mostly due to where the opening is in a premodern kimono, and women seldom wore undergarments; whereas, under certain circumstances, men could appear in public wearing  their undergarment, the fundoshi). It may also be considered impolite to sit in this manner in the presence of a superior or elders, unless permitted to do so.

References

External links

 

Japanese culture
Human positions
Sitting